Gal Bangalawa  (Stone Bungalow) is a guest house owned and operated by the University of Peradeniya, situated at  Mahakande, Peradeniya suburb of Kandy.

Formerly known as Wright's Bungalow, it belong to Colonel Thomas Yates Wright, a tea planter who owned the Mahakande Estate in which he built the bungalow in 1939. It was later taken over by the University of Ceylon, Peradeniya and used as married quarters for academics. At present it functions as one of three guest houses operated by the university for visiting academics.

External links
From LPs to cassettes - a trail of music sundayobserver.lk 2011/03/27
Gal Bangalawa (Stone Bungalow) at Mahakande July 1, 2009

University of Peradeniya
University of Ceylon
Houses in Kandy
Country houses in Sri Lanka
Houses completed in 1939